Makura, locally known as Makira, is a small inhabited island in Shefa Province of Vanuatu in the Pacific Ocean. Makura is a part of the Shepherds Islands archipelago.

Geography
The estimated terrain elevation above the sea level is some 132 meters. Makura is actually a peak of a primeval volcano. The other existing ramparts of the ancient volcanic rim are considered to be the neighboring islands of Emae and Mataso.

Population
As of 2015, the official local population was 93 people in 19 households. The island's main language is Namakura or Namakir.

References

Islands of Vanuatu
Shefa Province